The 34th Annual Bengal Film Journalists' Association Awards were held on 1971, honoring the best
Indian cinema in 1970.

Main Awards

Best India Film 

 Pratidwandi
 Mera Naam Joker
 Sagina Mahato
 Interview
 Samaj Ko Badal Dalo
 Diba Ratrir Kabya
 Satyakam
 Safar
 Darpan
 Aranyer Din Ratri

Best Director 

 Satyajit Ray – Pratidwandi

Best Actor 

 Dilip Kumar – Sagina Mahato

Best Actress 

 Madhabi Chakraborty – Diba Ratrir Kabya

Best Supporting Actor 

 Anil Chatterjee – Sagina Mahato

Best Supporting Actress 

 Kaberi Bose – Aranyer Din Ratri

Best Music Director 

 Tapan Sinha – Sagina Mahato

Best Lyricist 

 Late Tarashankar Banerjee – Manjari Opera

Best Male Playback Singer 

 Anup Ghosal – Sagina Mahato

Best Female Playback Singer 

 Asha Bhonsle – Megh Kalo

Best Screenplay 

 Satyajit Ray – Pratidwandi

Best Dialogue 

 Satyajit Ray – Pratidwandi

Best Cinematography (Black & White) 

 Soumendu Roy & Purnendu Bose – Pratidwandi

Best Art Director 

 Suniti Mitra – Sagina Mahato

Best Editor 

 Dulal Dutta – Pratidwandi

Best Audiography 

 J. D. Irani & Durgadas Mitra – Pratidwandi

Hindi Film Section

Best Director 

 Raj Kapoor – Mera Naam Joker

Best Actor 

 Raj Kapoor – Mera Naam Joker

Best Actress 

 Sharada – Samaj Ko Badal Dalo

Best Supporting Actor 

 Feroz Khan – Aadmi Aur Insaan

Best Supporting Actress 

 Shammi – Samaj Ko Badal Dalo

Best Music Director 

 S. D. Burman – Aradhana

Best Lyricist 

 Gopaldas Neeraj – Prem Pujari

Best Male Playback Singer 

 Kishore Kumar – Aradhana

Best Female Playback Singer 

 Lata Mangeshkar – Do Raaste

Best Screenplay 

 Asit Sen – Safar

Best Dialogue 

 Inder Raj Anand – Safar

Best Cinematography (Black & White) 

 Ram Chandra – Saat Hindustani

Best Cinematography (Colour) 

 Radhu Karmakar – Mera Naam Joker

Best Art Director 

 M. R. Achrekar – Mera Naam Joker

Best Editor 

 Tarun Dutta – Safar

Best Audiography 

 Allauddin – Mera Naam Joker

Special awards
 Rishi Raj Kapoor – Mera Naam Joker

Foreign Film Section

Three Best Film 

 ,  &  – Blow-Up
  – The Graduate
  – Blow Hot, Blow Cold

Best Director 

 Michelangelo Antonioni – Blow-Up

Best Actor 

 Dustin Hoffman – The Graduate

Best Actress 

 Vanessa Redgrave – The Loves of Isadora

References 

Bengal Film Journalists' Association Awards
1970 film awards
1970 in Indian cinema